Anne Bogart (born September 25, 1951) is an American theatre and opera director. She is currently one of the Artistic Directors of SITI Company, which she founded with Japanese director Tadashi Suzuki in 1992.  She is a professor at Columbia University where she runs the Graduate Directing Concentration and is the author of four books of essays on theater making: A Director Prepares; And Then, You Act; What's the Story; and The Art of Resonance. She is a co-author, with Tina Landau of The Viewpoints Book, a "practical guide" to Viewpoints training and devising techniques. Conversations with Anne, a collection of interviews she has conducted with various notable artists was published in March 2012.

Bogart's influence is felt throughout the contemporary theatre: through the widespread adoption of SITI's training methods of Viewpoints and Suzuki, her oeuvre of groundbreaking productions, and her guidance at SITI and including at Columbia University of such diverse talents as Pavol Liska, Diane Paulus, James Dacre, Kim Weild, Jay Scheib, Sophie Hunter, Shura Baryshnikov, Darko Tresnjak, Robert O'Hara, Rachel Chavkin, Brian Swibel, and many others.

Awards and recognition 
In 2018 London University awarded Bogart a Leverhulme Professorship.

See also
 LGBT culture in New York City
 List of self-identified LGBTQ New Yorkers
 Opera director
 Theatrical director

References 

Bogart, Anne. 2001. A Director Prepares: Seven Essays on Art and Theatre. London: Routledge. .
Bogart, Anne. 2007. And Then, You Act: Making Art in an Unpredictable World. London: Routledge. .
Bogart, Anne and Tina Landau. 2005. The Viewpoints Book: A Practical Guide to Viewpoints and Composition. New York: Theatre Communications Group..
Dixon, Michael Bigelow and Joel A. Smith, eds. 1995. Anne Bogart: Viewpoints. Career Development Ser. Lyme, NH: Smith and Kraus. .
Lampe, Eelka. 2001. "SITI – A Site of Stillness and Surprise:  Bogart's Viewpoints Training Meets Tadashi Suzuki's Method of Actor Training." in Performer Training: Developments Across Cultures. Ed. Ian Watson. Contemporary Theatre Studies Ser. London: Harwood Academic Publishers. . p. 171–189.

1951 births
Acting theorists
American opera directors
Female opera directors
American theatre directors
Bard College alumni
Columbia University faculty
LGBT theatre directors
American LGBT writers
Living people
Postmodern theatre
Theatre practitioners
Tisch School of the Arts alumni
LGBT people from Rhode Island
People from Newport, Rhode Island
Women theatre directors